The 21st Rhythmic Gymnastics European Championships were held in Moscow, Russia, from 10 to 12 April 2005.
Medals were contested in three disciplines : team competition, junior groups and senior individual with four apparatus.

Medal winners

Results

Seniors

Team

Ball

Rope

Clubs

Ribbon

Groups

Medal table

References

External links 
European Union of Gymnastics
Results

2005 in gymnastics
Rhythmic Gymnastics European Championships